Amata leimacis is a moth of the family Erebidae. It was described by William Jacob Holland in 1893. It is found in the Republic of the Congo and Gabon.

References

 

leimacis
Moths described in 1893
Moths of Africa